Tobias Arndal (born 1 September 1997) is a Danish professional footballer who plays as a midfielder for Hillerød in the Danish 2nd Division.

Career

AC Horsens
Arndal started his career in Tarup-Paarup IF, and later joined Oure FA, where he played as a senior player for three years in the Funen Series and Denmark Series. In July 2017, Arndal joined AC Horsens on a one-year contract after a successful trial.

Arndal was loaned out from AC Horsens to Næstved on 31 January 2019 for the rest of the season. However, he did not become eligible to play for the club because they didn't got his license registered in time. AC Horsens then decided to recall the player on 17 March and registered him so he could play the rest of the season with Horsens.

On 12 June 2019, it was confirmed, that Arndal's contract had been terminated by mutual consent.

Arendal
On 4 July 2019, Arndal joined Norwegian club Arendal on a 1.5-year contract.

Later career
On 18 February 2021, Arndal returned to Denmark and joined Danish 2nd Division club Hillerød.

References

External links
 

1997 births
Living people
Footballers from Odense
Danish men's footballers
Danish expatriate men's footballers
Danish Superliga players
Norwegian Second Division players
SfB-Oure FA players
Tarup-Paarup IF players
AC Horsens players
Næstved Boldklub players
Arendal Fotball players
Association football wingers
Danish expatriate sportspeople in Norway
Expatriate footballers in Norway